The 1989–90 Copa del Rey was the 88th staging of the Spanish Cup. The competition began on 6 September 1989 and concluded on 5 April 1990 with the final.

First round

|}

Second round

|}
Bye: Athletic Bilbao

Round of 16

|}

Quarter-finals

|}

Semi-finals

|}

Final

|}

References

External links
 rsssf.com
 linguasport.com

Copa del Rey seasons
Copa del Rey
Copa del Rey